Antti-P Jaatinen (born 24 July 1986) is a Finnish former professional ice hockey forward who played in the Finnish Liiga.

Playing career
Jaatinen made his SM-liiga debut playing with JYP Jyväskylä during the 2011–12 SM-liiga season.

Jaatinen concluded his 13-year professional career, after playing one season abroad with Boxers de Bordeaux of the French Ligue Magnus in the 2017–18 season.

Career statistics

References

External links

1986 births
Living people
Ässät players
Boxers de Bordeaux players
Finnish ice hockey left wingers
Hokki players
Ilves players
Jokipojat players
JYP-Akatemia players
JYP Jyväskylä players
Lahti Pelicans players
Peliitat Heinola players
People from Mikkeli
Vaasan Sport players
Sportspeople from South Savo